

The Old Kit Bag is the eleventh studio album by British singer-songwriter and guitarist Richard Thompson, released in 2003 on the Cooking Vinyl label.

Background
The title refers to the World War I marching song "Pack Up Your Troubles in Your Old Kit-Bag". When asked if the album had a theme, Thompson had no immediate answer, then said "I suppose the title is a theme of sorts. It's a reference to the old World War I song, 'Pack up your troubles in your old kit bag,' which is about smiling and whistling a happy tune as the Germans rain shells down on you."

After years of being a prestigious but small-selling signing with a big label, Thompson signed with the small, independent and independently-minded Cooking Vinyl label in 2002. The first fruits of this new partnership was The Old Kit Bag.

Thompson had financed the recording himself and relied on his new label for marketing and distribution ("I should have started doing that years ago because it means you own your own recordings").

The album is markedly different from its predecessors, with unobtrusive production by John Chelew and a smaller set of backing musicians ("the idea was to keep it small. I did do a few overdubs – second guitar, dulcimer, single-finger keyboard parts, all the easy stuff – but other than that, everything was pretty much a live performance"). Thompson's electric guitar playing is more prominent than it had been for some time on a studio album.

Despite the stripped down arrangements and sound, the album is stylistically diverse with Thompson even making a rare excursion into the blues on "I've Got No Right To Have It All". As is often the case with Thompson, the lyrics reflect darker side of life: "Gethsemane" deals with the disillusionment and pressure that follows an idyllic childhood, and "Outside Of The Inside" (which Thompson introduced on tour as "a song about how the Taliban see the West").

Reception
Ironically the move to a much smaller record label bought a bigger marketing push and healthier sales. Thompson had engineered a situation where live shows were his major revenue stream, but now The Old Kit Bag did better on release than any other Thompson album since Rumor And Sigh, entering the Billboard Top 200 and entering Billboard's "Indie" chart at number 5.

Track listing
All songs written by Richard Thompson

Chapter 1: The Haunted Keepsake 
"Gethsemane"
"Jealous Words"
"I'll Tag Along"
"A Love You Can't Survive"
"One Door Opens"
"First Breath"

Chapter 2: The Pilgrims Fancy 
"She Said It Was Destiny"
"I've Got No Right To Have It All"
"Pearly Jim"
"Word Unspoken, Sight Unseen"
"Outside Of The Inside"
"Happy Days And Auld Lang Syne"

Personnel

Musicians 
 Richard Thompson - electric guitar, acoustic guitar, mandolin, accordion, harmonium and vocals
 Judith Owen - backing vocals
 Danny Thompson - double bass
 Michael Jerome - drums, percussion and backing vocals

Technical 
 John Chelew - producer
 Jimmy Hoyson - recorder, mixer
 Mike Glines - assistant engineer
 Tornado design - package design
 Nancy Nimoy - illustrations
 Ron Slenzak+Associates - photography

References

Other sources 
Richard Thompson - The Biography, Patrick Humphries, Schirmer Books 
The Great Valerio, Dave Smith

External links
 

Richard Thompson (musician) albums
2003 albums
Albums recorded at Capitol Studios